Enchanted Lady is the fifth album by Detroit, Michigan-based R&B group Enchantment. It was their first for Columbia Records.

Track listing
"I Know Your Hot Spot"   	   	
"Enchanted Lady" 		
"Toe Jammin'" 		
"I Can't Forget You"		
"Adora" 		
"Only You" 		
"Your Love is Like a Melody" 		
"Peace is What The World Needs"

Charts
Singles

References

External links
 Enchantment-Enchanted Lady at Discogs

1982 albums
Enchantment (band) albums
Columbia Records albums